This article lists the complete results of the playoffs stage of the 2013 BWF World Junior Championships – Teams event in Bangkok, Thailand.

Position 5-8

Thailand vs Vietnam

Chinese Taipei vs Malaysia

5-6

Malaysia vs Thailand

7-8

Chinese Taipei vs Vietnam

Position 9-16

Singapore vs Russia

France vs Scotland

Germany vs Denmark

India vs Hong Kong

Position 17-24

Position 25-30

References

2013 BWF World Junior Championships
2013 in youth sport